Elections to the Charnwood Borough Council took place on 5 May 2011, in line with other local elections in the United Kingdom. A total of 52 councillors were elected from 28 wards as the whole council was up for election.

The Conservatives held control of the council after winning it at the previous election with a sizeable, albeit reduced, majority of 14 seats. The Labour Party regained some of their 2007 losses in Loughborough and Shepshed whilst the Liberal Democrats lost four seats, leaving them with a sole councillor in Anstey. The British National Party only fielded three candidates and therefore lost a substantial share of their previous vote; they did, however, hold on to their one seat in East Goscote by just five votes, meaning Councillor Cathy Duffy became one of the few BNP councillors in the whole country to be re-elected.

Results

|}

Ward results
In wards that are represented by more than one councillor, electors were given more than one vote each, hence the voter turnout may not match the number of votes cast.

Anstey

Barrow and Sileby West

Birstall Wanlip

Birstall Watermead

East Goscote

Forest Bradgate

Loughborough Ashby

Loughborough Dishley and Hathern

Loughborough Garendon

Loughborough Hastings

Loughborough Lemyngton

Loughborough Nanpantan

Loughborough Outwoods

Loughborough Shelthorpe

Loughborough Southfields

Loughborough Storer

Mountsorrel

Queniborough

Quorn and Mountsorrel Castle

Rothley and Thurcaston

Shepshed East

Shepshed West

Sileby

Syston East

Syston West

The Wolds

Thurmaston

Wreake Villages

References

2011
2011 English local elections
2010s in Leicestershire